Moshe Barbalat (born 1932) is a retired Israeli paralympic athlete and decorated war hero.

Barbalat did his national service in the Israel Defense Forces in the Armored Corps. In 1968, he was severely wounded in the Battle of Karameh and lost both of his legs. While badly injured and still under fire, he demanded that other wounded soldiers be evacuated before he was, and for this was awarded the Medal of Distinguished Service in 1973.

He competed for Israel and won gold medals in the men's standing volleyball events at the 1976 Summer Paralympics, the 1980 Summer Paralympics, and the 1984 Summer Paralympics.

He also competed in men's para athletics events. At the 1976 Summer Paralympics, he won bronze medals in the shot put C1 event and the discus throw C1 event, finished 8th in the javelin throw C1 event, and 9th in the precision javelin C1 event. At the 1980 Summer Paralympics, he finished 6th in the discus throw C1 event and 9th in the shot put C1 event.

See also 
 Israel at the 1976 Summer Paralympics
 Israel at the 1980 Summer Paralympics
 Israel at the 1984 Summer Paralympics

References 

Living people
Place of birth missing (living people)
Israeli men's volleyball players
Paralympic athletes of Israel
Paralympic volleyball players of Israel
Paralympic gold medalists for Israel
Paralympic bronze medalists for Israel
Paralympic medalists in athletics (track and field)
Paralympic medalists in volleyball
Athletes (track and field) at the 1976 Summer Paralympics
Athletes (track and field) at the 1980 Summer Paralympics
Volleyball players at the 1976 Summer Paralympics
Volleyball players at the 1980 Summer Paralympics
Volleyball players at the 1984 Summer Paralympics
Medalists at the 1976 Summer Paralympics
Medalists at the 1980 Summer Paralympics
Medalists at the 1984 Summer Paralympics
1932 births